Ilya Gavrilovich Voznesensky (also romanized as Ilia or Il'ia Voznesenskii or Wosnesenski, June 19, 1816 – May 18, 1871) was a Russian explorer and naturalist associated with the Russian Academy of Sciences who collected biological specimens and cultural artifacts from the Russian Far East and North and South America, known especially for his ten-year expedition in Russian America (parts of present-day Alaska and California), which he explored from 1839 to 1849. The expedition collected around 400 previously unknown species of plant and animals, and established the world's largest collection of ethnological artifacts of Russian America.  After the expedition, Voznesensky was appointed custodian of the Zoological Museum in St. Petersburg. Voznesensky was a corresponding member of the Russian Geographical Society and one of the founders of the Russian Entomological Society. He was awarded the Order of Saint Stanislaus, third class, in 1856.

References

Further reading

1816 births
1871 deaths
Explorers from Saint Petersburg
19th-century explorers
Scientists from Saint Petersburg
Biologists from the Russian Empire